The Waverley Country Club is a country club located in Clackamas County, Oregon United States. Chartered in 1896, the club was the second private golf club established west of the Mississippi River.

History
The club was established in April 1896, with its original golf course laid out several miles northeast, in the Richmond neighborhood, near the present-day corner of Southeast César E. Chávez Boulevard and Powell Boulevard. Established two years after the Tacoma Country and Golf Club, Waverley was the second private golf club in the United States established west of the Mississippi River.

A year later, in 1897, the club moved to its present location on the east bank of the Willamette River in unincorporated Clackamas County just south of the Sellwood neighborhood of Portland. It was built on the site of an orchard owned by Oregon pioneers Henderson Luelling and Seth Lewelling, where Seth and his orchard foreman Ah Bing developed the Bing cherry. A golf course was built at the current location in 1898. Jack Moffat, Waverley's first golf professional assisted members in routing the new course.  Between May 1912 and 1924, H. Chandler Egan assisted members in establishing the current course routing, completed comprehensive bunkering and constructed numerous green complexes. Until his death in 1936, Egan continued to guide all golf course improvements. Over the past century many of Egan’s classical design elements had been overgrown, or had disappeared. In 2012, Gil Hanse using old photographs, was critical in recognizing the masterpiece of classic golf design Egan had imprinted upon Waverley. Today Egan’s vision can be seen in the expert restoration of numerous classic architectural elements at Waverley Country Club.

The club, which was originally spelled Waverly after the Waverly-Richmond district in which it was first established, changed its name to Waverley in 1912, with some accounts blaming an engraving error for the change in spelling.

Course

Tournaments hosted
The Blyth Tournament, one of the oldest international golf matches in the United States, has been held at Waverley since 1897. The first Oregon Amateur Golf Tournament was held at Waverley in 1904.

Winners of major championship tournaments held at Waverley:

References

External links

1896 establishments in Oregon
Buildings and structures in Clackamas County, Oregon
Golf clubs and courses in Oregon
Sports venues completed in 1896
Sports venues in Portland, Oregon